Arsène Julien Herbinier (14 May 1869 – before 1955 in Paris) was a French lithograph artist.

Herbinier was born in Paris in 1869, the son of Aimée Arsène Herbinier.
He studied with Luc-Olivier Merson, Eugène Grasset and Alfred Jean Marie Broquelet.
He specialized in lithography.
His work was exhibited by the Société des Artistes Français, and in 1909 he was elected a full member of this society and awarded a third class medal.
His works were typical of the Art Nouveau style, including the clear influence of Japanese prints and the sinuous lines, naturalistic motifs and pale female figures draped in flowing gowns.

References

Art Nouveau illustrators
1869 births
1950s deaths
French lithographers
Year of death missing
Artists from Paris